Intrepid Aviation was an aviation museum based in hangar #4 in North Weald Airfield in North Weald, Essex, England. It was founded by David Gilmour of the rock band Pink Floyd, to own and operate his collection of vintage aircraft.

Gilmour's company went on to be a major player in the airshow business staging the Thurrock and North Weald airshows in addition to providing aircraft to perform at airshows around Europe during the 1990s. During this period Brendan Walsh formed the innovative 'Red Stars Race Team' that consisted of 10 Yak 52 Russian aircraft that staged spectacular pylon races at airshows in the UK. The Intrepid Aviation Company also supplied aircraft, pilots studio facilities and consultancy services to the film industry for over 80 productions including Steven Spielberg's Band of Brothers.

Gilmour sold the company after it became more and more commercial and less of a hobby:

References

Aerospace museums in England
Museums in Essex
North Weald Bassett